James Bell is an American football coach and former player. He served as the head football coach at Jackson State University in Jackson, Mississippi from 2003 to 2005 and Taylor University in Upland, Indiana from 2006 to 2007, compiling a career college football coaching record of 11–41.

Head coaching record

College

Notes

References

Year of birth missing (living people)
Living people
Central Arkansas Bears football coaches
Central Arkansas Bears football players
Jackson State Tigers football coaches
Lamar Cardinals football coaches
Louisville Cardinals football coaches
North Texas Mean Green football coaches
Northwest Missouri State Bearcats football coaches
Taylor Trojans football coaches
Wake Forest Demon Deacons football coaches
High school football coaches in Arkansas
High school football coaches in Louisiana
High school football coaches in Texas